Greenway's grunter (Hannia greenwayi) is a species of freshwater ray-finned fish, a grunter from the family Terapontidae. It is endemic to the northern part of Western Australia.

Description
Greenway's grunter is a small, slender golden to silvery-grey grunter which is covered in large scales, each with a dark margin and a dark blotch on the lower part of the caudal fin. The juveniles have a dark spot at base of the soft-rayed part of the dorsal and anal fin bases. The larger adult fish may develop thick, fleshy, lips and when caught individuals may show broad, vertical bars.

Distribution
Greenway's grunter is endemic to the Kimberley region of Western Australia where it occurs in the Fitzroy River system and Isdell and Calder rivers.

Habitat and biology
The adults of Greenway's grunter are found in moderately to swiftly flowing streams in both clear and turbid water where there is a mixed substrate of sand and rock. It is an omnivorous species feeding on algae and small invertebrates. The eggs are guarded and fanned by the male parent. It is though likely that this species spawns in the wet season.

Taxonomy and etymology
Greenway's grunter was first formally described in 1971 by Richard P. Vari with the type locality given as the Hann River at Moll Gorge in Western Australia. The generic name refers to the type locality while the specific name honours the American ornithologist James C. Greenway for his generous support of the American Museum of Natural History's Australian expedition on which the type was collected.

References

Hannia greenwayi. Atlas of Living Australia.

Greenway's grunter
Kimberley (Western Australia)
Freshwater fish of Western Australia
Endemic fauna of Australia

Greenway's grunter
Taxonomy articles created by Polbot